Momordica charantia (commonly called bitter melon; Goya; bitter apple; bitter gourd; bitter squash; balsam-pear; with many more names listed below) is a tropical and subtropical vine of the family Cucurbitaceae, widely grown in Asia, Africa, and the Caribbean for its edible fruit. Its many varieties differ substantially in the shape and bitterness of the fruit.

Bitter melon originated in Africa where it was a dry-season staple food of ǃKung hunter-gatherers. Wild or semi-domesticated variants spread across Asia in prehistory, and it was likely fully domesticated in Southeast Asia. It is widely used in the cuisines of East Asia, South Asia, and Southeast Asia.

Alternative names 

Bitter melon has many names in other languages, which have sometimes entered English as loanwords. Following are a few:

Description 

Each plant bears separate yellow male and female flowers. In the Northern Hemisphere, flowering occurs during June to July and fruiting during September to November. It is a frost-tender annual in the temperate zone and a perennial in the tropics. It grows best in the USDA zones 9 to 11.

The fruit has a distinct warty exterior and an oblong shape. It is hollow in cross-section, with a relatively thin layer of flesh surrounding a central seed cavity filled with large, flat seeds and pith. The fruit is most often eaten green, or as it is beginning to turn yellow. At this stage, the fruit's flesh is crunchy and watery in texture, similar to cucumber, chayote, or green bell pepper, but bitter. The skin is tender and edible.  Seeds and pith appear white in unripe fruits; they are not intensely bitter and can be removed before cooking.

Some sources claim the flesh (rind) becomes somewhat tougher and more bitter with age, but other sources claim that at least for the common Chinese variety the skin does not change and bitterness decreases with age.  The Chinese variety is best harvested light green possibly with a slight yellow tinge or just before.  The pith becomes sweet and intensely red; it can be eaten uncooked in this state, and is a popular ingredient in some Southeast Asian salads.

When the fruit is fully ripe, it turns orange and soft, and splits into segments which curl back to expose seeds covered in bright red pulp.

Varieties 
Bitter melon comes in a variety of shapes and sizes. The bitter melon more typical of India has a narrower shape with pointed ends, and a surface covered with jagged, triangular "teeth" and ridges. It is green to white in colour. Between these two extremes are any number of intermediate forms. Some bear miniature fruit of only  in length, which may be served individually as stuffed vegetables. These miniature fruits are popular in Bangladesh, India, Pakistan, Nepal, and other countries in South Asia. The sub-continent variety is most popular in Bangladesh and India.

Pests 
M. charantia is one of the main hosts of Bactrocera tau a fly known to prefer Cucurbitaceae.

Culinary uses 

Bitter melon is generally consumed cooked in the green or early yellowing stage. The young shoots and leaves of the bitter melon may also be eaten as greens. The fruit is very bitter raw and can be soaked in cold water and drained to remove some of those strong flavours.

In Chinese cuisine, bitter melon is valued for its bitter flavour, typically in stir-fries (often with pork and douchi), soups, dim sum, and herbal teas (gohyah tea). It has also been used in place of hops as the bittering ingredient in some beers in China and Okinawa.

Bitter gourd is commonly eaten throughout India. In North Indian cuisine, it is often served with yogurt on the side to offset the bitterness, used in curry such as sabzi, or stuffed with spices and then cooked in oil.

In South Indian cuisine, it is used in numerous dishes such as thoran / thuvaran (mixed with grated coconut), pavaikka mezhukkupuratti (stir-fried with spices), theeyal (cooked with roasted coconut), and pachadi (which is considered a medicinal food for diabetics), making it vital in Malayali's diet. Other popular recipes include preparations with curry, deep-frying with peanuts or other ground nuts, and Kakara kaya pulusu in Telugu, a soup with fried onions and other spices. In Karnataka, bitter melon is known as hāgalakāyi in Kannada; in Tamil Nadu it is known as paagarkaai or pavakai in Tamil. In these regions, a special preparation called pagarkai pitla, a kind of sour koottu, is common. Also commonly seen is kattu pagarkkai, a curry in which bitter melons are stuffed with onions, cooked lentil, and grated coconut mix, then tied with thread and fried in oil. In the Konkan region of Maharashtra, salt is added to finely chopped bitter gourd, known as karle in Marathi,  and then it is squeezed, removing its bitter juice to some extent. After frying this with different spices, the less bitter and crispy preparation is served with grated coconut. Bitter melon is known as karate in Goa; it is valued for its health benefits and used widely in Goan cuisine. In Bengal bitter melon is often simply eaten boiled and mashed with salt, mustard oil, sliced thinly and deep fried, added to lentils to make "tetor" dal (bitter lentils), and is a key ingredient of the Shukto, a Bengali vegetable medley that is a mixture of several vegetables like raw banana, drumstick stems, bori, and sweet potato.
 
In northern India and Nepal, bitter melon, known as tite karela in Nepali, is prepared as a fresh pickle. For this, the vegetable is cut into cubes or slices, and sautéed with oil and a sprinkle of water. When it is softened and reduced, it is crushed in a mortar with a few cloves of garlic, salt, and a red or green pepper. It is also eaten sautéed to golden-brown, stuffed, or as a curry on its own or with potatoes.

In Burmese cuisine, bitter melon is sauteéd with garlic, tomatoes, spices, and dried shrimp and is served as an accompaniment to other dishes. Such a dish is available at street stalls and deli counters throughout the country.

  is the term for it in Sri Lanka, and it is an ingredient in many different curry dishes (e.g., karawila curry and karawila sambol) which are served mainly with rice in a main meal. Sometimes large grated coconut pieces are added, which is more common in rural areas. Karawila juice is also sometimes served there.

In Pakistan, where it is known as karela in Urdu-speaking areas, and Bangladesh, where it is known as korola (করলা|করলা) in Bengali, bitter melon is often cooked with onions, red chili powder, turmeric powder, salt, coriander powder, and a pinch of cumin seeds.  Another dish in Pakistan calls for whole, unpeeled bitter melon to be boiled and then stuffed with cooked minced beef, served with either hot tandoori bread, naan, chappati, or with khichri (a mixture of lentils and rice).

In Indonesian cuisine, bitter melon, known as pare in Javanese and Indonesian (also paria), is prepared in various dishes, such as gado-gado, and also stir-fried, cooked in coconut milk, or steamed.  In Christian areas in Eastern Indonesia it is cooked with pork and chile, the sweetness of the pork balancing against the bitterness of the vegetable.

In Vietnamese cuisine, raw bitter melon slices known as mướp đắng or khổ qua in Vietnamese, eaten with dried meat floss and bitter melon soup with shrimp, are common dishes. Bitter melons stuffed with ground pork are commonly served as a summer soup in the south. It is also used as the main ingredient of stewed bitter melon. This dish is usually cooked for the Tết holiday, where its "bitter" name is taken as a reminder of the bitter living conditions experienced in the past.

In Thai cuisine, the Chinese variety of green bitter melon, mara in Thai, is prepared stuffed with minced pork and garlic, in a clear broth. It is also served sliced, stir-fried with garlic and fish sauce until just tender.  Varieties found in Thailand range from large fruit to small fruit.  The smallest fruit variety (mara khii nok) is generally not cultivated, but is occasionally found in the wild and is considered the most nutritious variety.

In the cuisine of the Philippines, bitter melon, known as ampalaya in Tagalog and parya in Ilokano, may be stir-fried with ground beef and oyster sauce, or with eggs and diced tomato. The dish pinakbet, popular in the Ilocos region of Luzon, consists mainly of bitter melons, eggplant, okra, string beans, tomatoes, lima beans, and other various regional vegetables all stewed together with a little bagoong-based stock.

In Trinidad and Tobago, bitter melons, known as caraille or carilley, are usually sautéed with onion, garlic, and scotch bonnet pepper until almost crisp.

In Mauritius, bitter melons are known as margose or margoze.

Traditional medicinal uses 

Bitter melon has been used in various Asian and African herbal medicine systems for a long time. In Turkey, it has been used as a folk remedy for a variety of ailments, particularly stomach complaints. In the traditional medicine of India, different parts of the plant are used as claimed treatments for diabetes (particularly polypeptide-p, an insulin analogue), and as a stomachic, laxative, antibilious, emetic, anthelmintic agent, for the treatment of cough, respiratory diseases, skin diseases, wounds, ulcer, gout, and rheumatism.

Pharmacology 
Momordica charantia has a number of alleged uses including cancer prevention, treatment of diabetes, fever, HIV and AIDS, and infections. While it has shown some potential clinical activity in laboratory experiments, "further studies are required to recommend its use". In 2012, the germplasm and chemical constituents, such as momordicin, charantin, cucurbitacin, and momordicoside D within several varieties of the gourd, were being studied.

For fever reduction and relief of menstrual problems, there is no scientific research to back these claims. For cancer prevention, HIV and AIDS, and treatment of infections, there is preliminary laboratory research, but no clinical studies in humans showing a benefit.

With regard to the use of M. charantia for diabetes, several animal studies and small-scale human studies have demonstrated a hypoglycemic effect of concentrated bitter melon extracts. In addition, a 2014 review shows evidence that Momordica charantia, when consumed in raw or juice form, can be efficacious in lowering blood glucose levels. However, multiple reviews have found that Momordica charantia does not significantly decrease fasting blood glucose levels or A1c, indicators of blood glucose control, when taken in capsule or tablet form. Momordica charantia may be beneficial in diabetes; however, the effects seem to depend on how it is consumed. More studies need to be performed in order to verify this effect.  The Memorial Sloan Kettering Cancer Center concludes that bitter melon "cannot be recommended as a replacement therapy for insulin or hypoglycemic drugs".

In the Caribbean, tea brewed from cerasee leaves is a popular remedy for stomach and abdominal ailments. The plant grows wild in many areas, and the tea is made with freshly gathered leaves. The dried leaves in tea bags are also sold commercially and are readily available for sale in stores.

Adverse effects 
Reported side effects include diarrhea, abdominal pain, fever, hypoglycemia, urinary incontinence, and chest pain. Symptoms generally are mild, do not require treatment, and resolve with abstinence and rest.

Pregnancy 
Bitter melon is contraindicated in pregnant women because it can induce bleeding, contractions, and miscarriage.

Bitter melon tea

Bitter melon tea, also known as gohyah (goya) tea, is an herbal tea made from an infusion of dried slices of the bitter melon. It is sold as a medicinal tea, and a culinary vegetable.

Gohyah is not listed in the Grieve's herbal database, the MPNA database at University of Michigan (Medicinal Plants of Native America, see Native American ethnobotany), or in the Phytochemical Database of the USDA – Agricultural Research Service (ARS) – National Plant Germplasm System NGRL.

Subspecies
The plant has one subspecies and four varieties:

Momordica charantia var. abbreviata
Momordica charantia var. charantia
Momordica charantia ssp. macroloba
Momordica charantia L. var. muricata
Momordica charantia var. pavel

M. charantia var. charantia and pavel are the long-fruited varieties, whereas M. charantia var. muricata, macroloba and abbreviata feature smaller fruits.

Gallery

Plant

Dishes and other uses

In popular culture 
 In Rudyard Kipling's Letting in the Jungle (one of the stories in the Second Jungle Book), after having Hathi destroy Buldeo's village, Mowgli entwines the Karela vine to and fro about the trampled houses while singing Mowgli's Song Against People, each of whose stanzas ends with a verse about the bitter Karela having taken up the villagers' place.

See also 
 Momordica balsamina (balsam apple)
 Momordica cochinchinensis (gac)
 Momordica cymbalaria
 Momordica foetida

References

External links 

 Bitter Melon Cultivation

Abortifacients
Asian vegetables
Flora of Pakistan
Flora of the Maldives
Fruit vegetables
Medicinal plants of Asia
Melons
charantia
Okinawan cuisine
Plants described in 1753
Taxa named by Carl Linnaeus
Plants used in traditional African medicine
Philippine cuisine